The Zeiss Touit 2.8/50M is an APS-C macro prime lens for Sony E and Fujifilm X mounts announced by Zeiss on January 30, 2014.

Build quality
The lens features a minimalist matte-black plastic exterior with a Zeiss badge on the side of the barrel and a rubber focus ring.

See also
 List of third-party E-mount lenses
 Fujifilm X-mount Lenses
Sony E 30mm F3.5 Macro
 Sony FE 50mm F2.8 Macro

Sources
http://www.dpreview.com/products/zeiss/lenses/zeiss_touit_50_2p8/specifications

Camera lenses introduced in 2014
Touit 2.8 50M
X-mount lenses
Macro lenses